Martin Wimmer (born 11 October 1957 in Munich) is a former Grand Prix motorcycle road racer from Germany. He had his best year in 1985 when he won the German Grand Prix, and had two second places, finishing the 250cc season in fourth place behind Freddie Spencer, Anton Mang and Carlos Lavado.

In 1987, Yamaha teamed him with Kevin Magee to win the Suzuka 8 Hours endurance race. In 2009, he joined Ralf Waldmann in buying out the motorbike manufacturing company MZ, from the Hong Leong Group.

He formed Motorenwerke Zschopau GmbH and ran it with the Investor Peter Ertel until September 2012, when he had to file for insolvency proceedings. His bank, Merkur Bank KGaA, had withdrawn a loan offer short term despite the company having a fixed term account. Currently there are several legal court proceedings. Wimmer published a book about the case in November 2014. The name of the book is: Der Fall MZ ... durch die Bank weg ...

Motorcycle Grand Prix Results
Points system from 1969 to 1987:

Points system from 1988 to 1992:

(key) (Races in bold indicate pole position; races in italics indicate fastest lap)

Suzuka 8 Hours results

References

1957 births
Living people
Sportspeople from Munich
German motorcycle racers
250cc World Championship riders
350cc World Championship riders